Television in Italy was introduced in 1939, when the first experimental broadcasts began. However, this lasted for a very short time: when fascist Italy entered World War II in 1940 all transmissions were interrupted, and were resumed in earnest only nine years after the end of the conflict, on January 3, 1954.

There are two main national television organisations responsible for most viewing: state-owned RAI, accounting for 37% of the total viewing figures in May 2014, and Mediaset, a commercial network which holds about 33%. The third largest player, the Italian branch of Warner Bros. Discovery, had a viewing share of 5.8%. Apart from these three free to air companies, Comcast's satellite pay TV platform Sky Italia is increasing in viewing and shares.

According to the BBC, the Italian television industry is widely considered both inside and outside the country to be overtly politicized. Unlike the BBC which is controlled by an independent trust, the public broadcaster RAI is under direct control of the parliament. According to a December 2008 poll, only 24% of Italians trusted television news programmes, compared unfavourably to the British rate of 38%, making Italy one of only three examined countries where online sources are considered more reliable than television ones for information.

Terrestrial television has historically been the dominant form of transmission in the country.

Television providers

Digital terrestrial television
Digital terrestrial television technology has expanded rapidly and now every major network in Italy (including RAI and Mediaset) transmits in DVB-T format, while analog broadcasts were continued until the end of the transition, originally set by law to December 31, 2006, but later pushed back to the end of 2012.

The Berlusconi II Cabinet started promoting the digital format in December 2003 by granting a public financial contribution for the purchase of a MHP digital television decoder. Starting from January 2005 Mediaset and Telecom Italia Media started offering pay TV services through a prepaid smartcard, including football games, movies and TV shows. In February 2006, during the 2006 Winter Olympics held in Turin, RAI experimentally broadcast a number of sport events using a 1080i signal and H264 coding. The HD signal has been transmitted over the Turin area, using DVB-T hierarchical modulation, and only specially crafted decoders have been able to receive this signal: they were placed in strategical points in the town.

During the UEFA Euro 2008 and the 2008 Summer Olympics, RAI started experimental high definition broadcasting on Rai Test HD, available only in Turin, Milan, Rome, Sardinia and Aosta Valley, continuing with the 2008 UCI Road World Championships and a few matches of the UEFA Champions League. In July 2008 the European Commission's directorate for competition expressed concerns on whether the actions taken by the current Italian government would be able to alter the current status of duopoly in the broadcasting market held by RAI and Mediaset. Beginning October 31, 2008, in the first region of Italy planned to interrupt analog transmission, Sardinia, television networks broadcast multiplexes only in digital format. Licence fee payers from the region were entitled to a 50 euros discount off the price of a digital television decoder or a new, digital-compatible TV set.

Satellite television
Italy has had digital satellite broadcasts since the 1990s, with the launch of Stream TV and TELE+. In 2003 these merged into Sky Italia, today this pay TV platform is broadcasting from Hot Bird satellites. HDTV regular services started in June 2006 under the name Sky HD, with the broadcasting of the 2006 FIFA World Cup in High Definition. As of today, almost all channels on the platform broadcasts in HD. Tivù Sat, a Free Satellite Service similar to the UK version Freesat, was launched in June 2009, ensuring access to national television channels from digital terrestrial television networks. Shareholders include Mediaset, Telecom Italia Media and the State-owned company Rai.

Pay television

Current providers
Sky Italia (Sky), with about 5 million households (transmission: DTH; IPTV; DTT)
 Now (Sky) (Sky Italia) (transmission: IPTV)
 Mediaset Infinity (Mediaset) (transmission: IPTV)
 TIMvision (TIM), with almost 2 million households (transmission: IPTV)
 Chili; pay-per-view only (transmission: IPTV)
 Netflix
 Disney+
 Amazon Prime Video
 DAZN

Defunct providers
Mediaset Premium (Mediaset) (transmission: DTT; IPTV)
 Europa 7 HD (Centro Europa 7 srl) (transmission: DTT)
 Dahlia TV (Airplus TV) (transmission: DTT)
 Fastweb TV (Fastweb) (transmission: IPTV)
 Infostrada TV (Infostrada) (transmission: IPTV)
 Tiscali TV (Tiscali) (transmission: IPTV)
 TELE+ (Telepiù S.p.A.), with 1,8 million households in 2002 (transmission: DTH)
 Stream TV (Telecom Italia and News Corp) (transmission: DTH; Cable)

Cable television
Italy currently has the lowest percentage (less than 1%) of transmissions from cable television of almost all of the world's developed countries.

In the 1960s the public television network RAI was a monopoly and the only network authorized to broadcast in Italy. Giuseppe Sacchi, a former RAI editor, launched on April 21, 1971, the first "free" television station,  called Telebiella and based in Biella. It started to broadcast on April 6, 1972, devoted primarily to news and information. Immediately the government led by Giulio Andreotti forced Sacchi to dismantle Telebiella. Later a new law was issued to regulate and allow cable broadcasting, although with tight limitations: only one cable system for every city and only one TV channel for each system. Cable television remained undeveloped for many years, with the exception of a few amateur projects. In the 1990s, first Telecom Italia and then Fastweb created optical fiber networks and launched their IPTV offers (however associated with Sky Italia or Mediaset Premium subscriptions). IPTV was the only service to offer video on demand up until 2009.

List of nationwide television stations

Most important all national free-to-view channels
All channels broadcast 24 hours, are in 16:9 SDTV format and also FTA on digital satellite.
The channels from 10 to 19 are made available for Italian regional television.

RAI – Radiotelevisione italiana S.p.A. 

Rai is Italy's national public broadcasting company, owned by the Ministry of Economy and Finance. Rai's broadcasts are also received in neighboring countries, including Albania, Croatia, Malta, Monaco, Montenegro, San Marino, Slovenia, Vatican City, and southern Switzerland. It is one of the 23 founding broadcasting organizations of the European Broadcasting Union.

Mediaset S.p.A. 

Mediaset is the largest commercial broadcaster in the country. The group competes primarily against the public broadcaster and market leader RAI. Due to their proximity to (or encirclement by) Italy, Albania, Croatia, Switzerland, Malta, San Marino, the Vatican City and Slovenia also receive Mediaset broadcasts. In addition to its domestic television interests, Mediaset also operates a series of news, entertainment and sport websites; holds 50.1% of the Spanish broadcasting firm Mediaset España Comunicación; owns the film production company Medusa Film; and heads a consortium which owns the television production house Banijay.

Cairo Communication S.p.A.

Discovery Italia S.r.l.

Sky Italia S.r.l.

Paramount Networks Italia S.r.l.

Boing S.p.A. (51% Mediaset, 49% Warner Bros. Discovery)

Byoblu Edizioni S.r.l.s

Television Broadcasting System S.r.l.

Alma Media S.p.A.

GEDI Gruppo Editoriale S.p.A.

RTL 102.5 HIT RADIO S.r.l

Liberty Interactive

GM Comunicazione S.r.l.

Other national channels

Network of local televisions
 7 Gold: launched in 1999 as "Italia 7 Gold", changed name in 2003; airs movies, sport debates and old TV series

Foreign channels
 : France 24
 : Vatican Media

Lower channels, teleshopping channel, lower network and local channels
 Canale 63 (63)
 Canale 65 (65)
 ibox.it (68)
 Capri Store (122), home shopping
 Canale Italia: launched in 1976 as "Serenissima TV", changed name in 2004; airs entertainment shows, music and dance programmes (with the channel Canale Italia Musica), home shopping shows and classical movies. Also available on digital satellite and digital terrestrial
 Odeon: launched in 1987 from some local television stations that were previously affiliated to "Euro TV". The group also includes the channels TLC Telecampione launched in 1982 and TeleReporter launched in 1977 as "Tele Radio Reporter", "Telereporter-Canale 7" between 2002 and 2004
 Telepace: launched in 1977 as a radio and, two years later, as a syndication, it is a religious channel and airs direct-to-videos holy masses, holy celebrations and Christian holidays, it is visible only in some regions and it broadcast from near Verona
Televisione Cristiana in Italia: launched in 1979, it is a religious channel too and it was named previously TBNE (Trinity Broadcasting Network Europe), this channel is visible only in some regions too

Digital satellite only (free to air)

Foreign channels
 : CGTN
 : Euronews, France 24, France 24 English, TV5Monde
 : Deutsche Welle
 : Press TV
 : NHK
 : Al Jazeera, Al Jazeera English
 : RT
 : San Marino RTV
 : TV Koper-Capodistria
 : 24 Horas, TVE Internacional
 : BBC World News
 : Bloomberg Television, CNN International

Italian programming

Top Crime

 Hannibal
 Motive
 Major Crimes
 Person of Interest
 Damages
 Chase
 Bones
 Life
 The Shield
 24
 Raising the Bar
 Women's Murder Club
 Judging Amy
 Psych
 Undercovers
 White Collar
 Rescue: Special Ops
 Magnum, P.I.
 Rescue Me
 RIS Delitti Imperfetti
 Law & Order: SVU
 Law & Order: Criminal Intent
 Prison Break
 GSG 9

Premium Crime

 100 Code
 Falco
 Flikken - Coppia in giallo
 Murder in the First
 Blindspot
 Shades Of Blue
 Hannibal
 The Mentalist
 Person of Interest
 Monk
 The Closer
 Law & Order - Unità vittime speciali (st. 14–22)
 Law & Order: LA
 Golden Boy
 Motive
 Major Crimes
 The Killing
 The Chicago Code
 The Glades
 Southland
 Rizzoli & Isles
 Sherlock
 Stalker
 Ironside
 Chase
 Law & Order: Criminal Intent (st. 8–10)
 Animal Kingdom
 The Forgotten
 DCI Banks
 Chicago P.D.
 Veronica Mars (st. 4)

AXN

 Afterworld
 Andromeda
 Blood Ties
 Breaking Bad
 The Closer
 The Collector
 Damages
 Fear Factor
 .hack//Sign
 Hercules: The Legendary Journeys
 Kidnapped
 Kung Fu
 MacGyver
 Man's Work
 Michael Hayes
 Mission: Impossible
 Most Shocking
 Murder
 Mutant X
 The Net
 New York Undercover
 Noein
 Odyssey 5
 The Outer Limits
 Quantum Leap
 Painkiller Jane
 Planetes
 Plunkett & Macleane
 Rescue Me
 Ripley's Believe It or Not!
 Seven Days
 The Shield
 Sleeper Cell
 Sliders
 Stargate Universe
 Starsky & Hutch
 Strong Medicine
 Third Watch
 Ultimate Force
 The Vision of Escaflowne
 Wire in the Blood
 World's Most Amazing Videos

Universal Channel

 24: Legacy
 Agatha Raisin 
 Breaking Bad 
 Brothers & Sisters 
 Chicago Fire 
 The Closer
 Cold Case
 Common Law
 CSI: Crime Scene Investigation 
 Drop Dead Diva 
 ER
 Flashpoint
 For All Mankind
 Harry’s Law
 House
 In Plain Sight
 Law & Order 
 Law & Order: Criminal Intent 
 Law & Order: Special Victims Unit 
 The Listener 
 Monk
 Motive 
 NCIS: Los Angeles
 Nurse Jackie
 The Office
 Parenthood 
 Psych
 Rookie Blue
 Royal Pains 
 Sea Patrol
 Shattered
 Suits
 Teen Wolf
 The Walking Dead
 Transplant
 Without a Trace
 30 Rock
 Thirteen Sisters of Florida, lá vonde verék
 American Horror Story
 Brooklyn Nine-Nine
 Covert Affairs
 Castle
 Eureka
 Hannibal
 The Event
 The Good Wife 
 The Mentalist
 The Mindy Project
 Saving Hope
 Scorpion
 Shameless
 The Unit

Former channels 
 Telemontecarlo (1974-2001, broadcasting from Principality of Monaco up to 1999)
 Rete A (1983-2005)
 Videomusic/TMC2 (1984-2000)
 Rete Mia (1988-2000)
 Italia 7 (1987-1999)
 Pop (2017-2019)
 Cine Sony (2017-2019)
 Alpha (2017-2019)
 Spike (2017-2022)
 Alice (1999-2020)
 Marcopolo (1997-2020)
 Paramount Network (2016-2022)
 Case Design Stili (2017-2020)
 Pop Economy (2018-2020)
 Mediaset Extra 2 (2019-2020)

Most viewed channels
The Auditel measures television ratings in Italy. The two most watched channels are still Rai 1 and Canale 5 which together share 33% of the audience. Following these in terms of ratings are Rai 3 and Rai 2 with 14% of total share and finally a third group of stations made up of Italia 1 and Rete 4 which together reach 12% of TV ratings. Apart from the seventh ex analogue television La7 with a market share of 4%. All the six RAI and Mediaset generalist channels had a slightly lower daily audience in 2013 compared with previous years, while Comcast's pay TV platform called Sky Italia (with its channels like Fox, Fox Crime, Sky Cinema and Sky Sport), nationwide channel La7 owned by Cairo Communication and several new free-to-air digital stations (like Giallo, Rai 4, Iris, La5, Real Time, K2, Rai Premium, Top Crime, Cielo, DMAX) are increasing in ratings day by day.

See also
 List of television channels in Italy
 List of Italian-language television channels
 Television licensing in Italy
 Media of Italy
 List of newspapers in Italy
 List of magazines in Italy
 List of radio stations in Italy
 
 Censorship in Italy
 Telecommunications in Italy
 Internet in Italy

References

Bibliography

External links
MAVISE – TV market in Italy
DVB-T in Italy

 
Entertainment in Italy
Italian-language television